The 2007 Segunda División Peruana season was the 62nd edition of the second tier of Federación Peruana de Futbol. There were  11 teams in play. Only 9 teams from the 2006 edition remained. Hijos de Acosvinchos, runner-up of the 2006 Copa Peru was promoted to the 2007 edition while Unión Huaral, which was relegated from the 2006 Peruvian first division, also participated in the tournament. The champion, Universidad César Vallejo, was promoted to the 2008 Peruvian First Division. The last place, Alfonso Ugarte of Puno, was relegated its respective regional league. The tournament was played on a home-and-away round-robin basis.

Teams

Table

Standings

Results

Promotion playoff

References

External links
 RSSSF

Peruvian Segunda División seasons
Peru2
2007 in Peruvian football